was a Japanese samurai of the Sengoku period, who ruled Kutsukidani Castle in Ōmi Province. He was a supporter of the shōgun Ashikaga Yoshiharu. Harutsuna's descendants became daimyō in the Edo period.

Family
 Father: Kitsuki Tanetsuna
 Wife: Asukai Masatsuna's daughter
 Son: Kutsuki Mototsuna by Asukai Masatsuna's daughter

References

1518 births
1550 deaths
Japanese warriors killed in battle
Samurai
Kutsuki clan